Hassan Ali (born 1 January 1959) is a former Iraqi football defender who played for Iraq at the 1982 Asian Games.

Hassan played for Iraq between 1981 and 1983.

References

Iraqi footballers
Iraq international footballers
Living people
Association football defenders
Footballers at the 1982 Asian Games
Al-Ittihad SC players
1959 births
Asian Games competitors for Iraq